Streptomyces haliclonae is a bacterium species from the genus of Streptomyces which has been isolated from the sponge Haliclona sp in the Chiba prefecture from the coast of Tateyama City in Japan.

See also 
 List of Streptomyces species

References

Further reading

External links
Type strain of Streptomyces haliclonae at BacDive -  the Bacterial Diversity Metadatabase

haliclonae
Bacteria described in 2010